Phil Kwabina Davis (born September 25, 1984) is an American mixed martial artist who currently competes as a Light Heavyweight for Bellator MMA, where he is the former Bellator Light Heavyweight World Champion. Prior to signing with Bellator, Davis competed in the Ultimate Fighting Championship, where he achieved success as a top 5 Light Heavyweight contender and held a UFC record of 9–3 (1). He is currently ranked as the #5 Light Heavyweight fighter in the world by ranking site Fight Matrix. Davis first gained athletic notoriety in college as a wrestler for Penn State University, where he became an NCAA Division I champion in 2008. As of October 19, 2021, #2 in the Bellator Light Heavyweight Rankings.

Background
Davis was born and raised in Harrisburg, Pennsylvania with his two older brothers, Jeffery and John. He began wrestling when he was in the seventh grade  and then attended Harrisburg High School where he was a four-year team captain and letterman, with a 112-17 career record. Davis also lettered in tennis and cross-country running. He then went on to wrestle for the Penn State Nittany Lions wrestling team, finishing in 5th place nationally in the 197 lb weight class as a junior in 2007 and then winning the (197 lbs) NCAA title in 2008. He finished with an overall wrestling record of 116–20 while at Penn State and was a four-time NCAA Division I All-American. After graduating from Penn State, he began training with the newly formed LionHeart MMA team, coached by Jeff Rockwell (Brazilian Jiu-Jitsu), TJ Turner (boxing), Mark Miller, (kickboxing and Muay Thai), Matt Kocher (wrestling/S&C) and Ryan Gruhn (Muay Thai) in State College, Pennsylvania. When Phil returns to State College/Penn State he trains at Central PA Mixed Martial Arts with Head Instructor; Ryan Gruhn as he has for Bellator 186 on November 4 at the Bryce Jordan Center.

Mixed martial arts career
Davis' primary training partners were Paul Bradley, Lou Armezzani and Jimy Hettes. He also trained with many visiting fighters such as Dave Herman, Shanon Slack, Dominick Cruz, Jon Jones and Cain Velasquez. When the LionHeart team disbanded in 2009, Davis moved to San Diego, California to continue his training with Alliance MMA. Davis earned his blue belt in Brazilian Jiu-Jitsu under Lloyd Irvin in 2009. In 2009 he won the No Gi Grappling World Jiu-Jitsu Championship as a blue belt in the 221 lbs, Super Heavyweight division. Davis began his professional mixed martial arts career in 2008, compiling a record of 4–0 in regional promotions across the United States.

Ultimate Fighting Championship
Davis signed with the Ultimate Fighting Championship in December 2009.

First contender run
Davis made his UFC debut against Brian Stann on February 6, 2010, at UFC 109, winning by unanimous decision.

Davis faced Alexander Gustafsson on April 10, 2010, at UFC 112. Davis defeated Gustafsson via submission (anaconda choke) in the first round, giving Gustafsson his first loss.

Davis next faced Rodney Wallace on August 7, 2010, at UFC 117, replacing the injured Stanislav Nedkov. Davis controlled the bout with his wrestling and won by unanimous decision.

Davis fought Tim Boetsch on November 20, 2010, at UFC 123. He won by a one-handed modified kimura submission later dubbed the "Mr. Wonderful." He was awarded $80,000 for Submission of the Night and received the Submission of the Year award from MMANews247.com.

Davis was expected to face Matt Hamill in Toronto at UFC 129. However, Hamill was tapped as a replacement for Thiago Silva against Rampage Jackson at UFC 130. Davis was offered a fight against Jason Brilz, but then he replaced the injured Tito Ortiz on 6 weeks' notice against Antônio Rogério Nogueira in his first UFC main event on March 26, 2011, at UFC Fight Night 24. Davis defeated Nogueira by unanimous decision.

When UFC Light Heavyweight Champion Jon Jones pulled out of a long-awaited title fight for Rashad Evans, Phil Davis agreed to fight Evans on August 6, 2011, at UFC 133, but on July 12, Davis pulled out of the event with a knee injury and was replaced by Tito Ortiz. Davis was announced to face Lyoto Machida on December 10, 2011, at UFC 140, however, shortly after, it was revealed that Davis was still recovering from a knee injury and the fight did not occur.

Davis faced former UFC Light Heavyweight Champion Rashad Evans in a Number 1 contender fight on January 28, 2012, at UFC on Fox 2. Despite Davis' substantial wrestling credentials, Evans dominated him on the canvas, coasting to a unanimous decision.

Second contender run
Davis was expected to face Chad Griggs on August 4, 2012, at UFC on FOX 4. However, Griggs was forced out of the bout with an injury and was replaced by promotional newcomer Wagner Prado. The fight was ruled "No Contest" after an accidental eye poke at 1:28 of round 1 rendered Prado unable to continue. A rematch with Prado, briefly linked to UFC on FX 5, took place on October 13, 2012, at UFC 153. Davis won the rematch with a second round anaconda choke submission.

Davis was expected to face Forrest Griffin on December 29, 2012, at UFC 155. However, in early December, Griffin pulled out of the bout, citing a knee injury. Davis faced Vinny Magalhães in a wrestler vs. BJJ specialist fight on April 27, 2013, at UFC 159. He won the fight by unanimous decision.

On August 3, 2013, at UFC 163, Davis won a controversial unanimous decision against former UFC Light Heavyweight Champion Lyoto Machida. Davis' only significant advantage was ground and pound following take-downs in the last minute of rounds one and two. While ESPN scored the fight for Davis, 13 selected UFC affiliate media outlets scored the fight in favor of Machida. An SP Nation fanpost stated, "Some MMA commentators and bloggers scored the fight 30–27 for Lyoto Machida." UFC president Dana White tweeted shortly after the fight that he had Machida winning all three rounds, and later told Yahoo! Sports "Machida definitely won", "MMA judging sucks", and his oft-repeated advice: "Never leave it in the hands of the judges." Machida left the light heavyweight division and went on to fight for the UFC Middleweight Championship.

With an official win over the highly ranked Machida, Davis looked to move into title contention against Anthony "Rumble" Johnson who returned to the UFC riding a six-fight win streak at light heavyweight (including one heavyweight fight) outside the promotion, following his disastrous and much-criticised previous UFC run at welterweight. Despite Davis being a considerable betting favorite, on April 26, 2014, in the co-main event at UFC 172, Johnson shut down Davis' wrestling game and kept the fight standing, where his pronounced edge in the striking won him all three rounds in a unanimous decision.

Leading up to the UFC 172 event, Davis actively baited UFC Light Heavyweight Champion Jon Jones on a media promotion conference call. Later, he disparaged Jones' achievements against undersized competition, claiming "against actual light heavyweights, he's been so-so". He predicted that he would soon claim the title, while explicitly dismissing the challenge of his own booked opponent Anthony Johnson. Jones, who defended the UFC Light Heavyweight title against Glover Teixeira at the same event, took pleasure in mocking Davis' loss at the post-fight press conference, and later on-line.

Final UFC fights
After UFC 172, Davis faced Glover Teixeira who was coming off a loss to UFC Light Heavyweight Champion Jon Jones on the same card. The fight took place October 25, 2014, at UFC 179. He utilized his wrestling advantage and won the fight by unanimous decision.

Having just one fight left of his UFC contract, Davis faced Ryan Bader on January 24, 2015, at UFC on Fox 14. He lost the fight by a close split decision. He did not re-sign with the UFC. Davis finished his UFC career with a record of 9–3 (1) within the promotion.

Bellator MMA
Following his final fight in the UFC, Davis parted from the organization and signed with Bellator MMA on April 15, 2015.

Road to the title
Davis made his debut as a participant in Bellator's one-night Light Heavyweight tournament at Bellator MMA & Glory: Dynamite 1 on September 19, 2015. He faced Emanuel Newton in the opening round and won by submission due to a kimura. He was scheduled to face Muhammed Lawal in the final. However, Lawal was unable to advance to the finals due to a rib injury and was replaced by alternate Francis Carmont. Davis won the bout via knockout in the first round.

By winning the tournament, Davis was set up to face Bellator Light Heavyweight Champion Liam McGeary at a yet-to-be-determined event. However, on February 19, 2016, it was announced that Davis next opponent would be Muhammed Lawal in a no 1 contender fight on May 14, 2016, at Bellator 154. He won the fight by unanimous decision.

Davis faced Liam McGeary for the Bellator Light Heavyweight Championship in the main event at Bellator 163 on November 4, 2016. He won the bout via unanimous decision to become the new Bellator Light Heavyweight champion.

Title and post-title reign
Davis faced his former opponent Ryan Bader again in a title fight on June 24, 2017, at Bellator 180. Bader and Davis first met at UFC on Fox: Gustafsson vs. Johnson on January 24, 2015, with Bader winning by split decision. He was defeated again via split decision, thus losing the Bellator title.

Davis faced undefeated Brazilian fighter Leo Leite on November 3, 2017, at Bellator 186. He won the fight via unanimous decision.

Davis faced Linton Vassell on May 25, 2018, at Bellator 200. He won the fight via knock out due to a head kick in round three.

Davis faced Vadim Nemkov on November 15, 2018, Bellator 209. He lost the fight via split decision.

Davis next faced Liam McGeary at Bellator 220 on April 27, 2019. He won the fight via TKO in the third round.

On August 15, 2019, it was announced that Davis had signed an exclusive multi-fight, multi-year contract extension with Bellator. In his first fight on that contract, Davis faced Karl Albrektsson at Bellator 231 on October 25, 2019. He won the fight via TKO in the third round.

Davis headlined Bellator 245 in a rematch against Lyoto Machida on September 11, 2020. He won the fight by split decision.

Bellator Light Heavyweight World Grand Prix
On February 9, 2021, it was announced that Davis would be participating in the Bellator Light Heavyweight World Grand Prix Tournament. Davis is scheduled to face Vadim Nemkov for the Bellator Light Heavyweight World Championship in the quarterfinal round. This will be a rematch of their November 2018 bout, which saw Nemkov win via split decision. The bout took place at Bellator 257 on April 16. Davis lost the bout via unanimous decision, with Nemkov controlling the first three rounds on the feet.

Post Grand Prix 
Davis faced Yoel Romero, who was making his Bellator debut, on September 18, 2021 at Bellator 266. He won the bout via split decision. Five out of five media outlets scored the fight for Davis.

Davis faced Julius Anglickas on March 12, 2022 at Bellator 276. He won the bout via unanimous decision.

Championships and achievements

Collegiate wrestling
National Collegiate Athletic Association
NCAA Division I All-American out of Pennsylvania State University (2005, 2006, 2007, 2008)
NCAA Division I 197 lb – Champion out of Pennsylvania State University (2008)
NCAA Division I 197 lb – Runner-up out of Pennsylvania State University (2006)

Mixed martial arts
Bellator MMA
Bellator Light Heavyweight World Championship (One time; former)
Bellator MMA Dynamite 1 Light Heavyweight Grand Prix Champion
Most wins in Bellator Light Heavyweight division (11)
Most bouts in Bellator Light Heavyweight division (14)
Ultimate Fighting Championship
Submission of the Night (One time) 
MMA News 247
Submission of the Year (2010) vs Tim Boetsch on November 20, 2010

Mixed martial arts record

|-
|Win
|align=center|24–6 (1)
|Julius Anglickas
|Decision (unanimous)
|Bellator 276
|
|align=center|3
|align=center|5:00
|St. Louis, Missouri, United States
|
|- 
|Win
|align=center|23–6 (1)
|Yoel Romero
|Decision (split)
|Bellator 266
|
|align=center|3
|align=center|5:00
|San Jose, California, United States
|
|-
|Loss
|align=center|22–6 (1)
|Vadim Nemkov
|Decision (unanimous)
|Bellator 257 
|
|align=center|5
|align=center|5:00
|Uncasville, Connecticut, United States 
|
|-
|Win
|align=center|22–5 (1)
|Lyoto Machida
|Decision (split)
|Bellator 245
|
|align=center|3
|align=center|5:00
|Uncasville, Connecticut, United States
|
|-
|Win
|align=center|21–5 (1)
|Karl Albrektsson
|TKO (punches)
|Bellator 231
|
|align=center|3
|align=center|3:06
|Uncasville, Connecticut, United States
|
|-
|Win
|align=center|20–5 (1)
|Liam McGeary
|TKO (jaw injury)
|Bellator 220
|
|align=center|3
|align=center|4:11
|San Jose, California, United States
|
|-
|Loss
|align=center| 19–5 (1)
|Vadim Nemkov
|Decision (split)
|Bellator 209
|
|align=center|3
|align=center|5:00
|Tel Aviv, Israel
|
|-
|Win
|align=center| 19–4 (1)
|Linton Vassell
|KO (head kick)
|Bellator 200
|
|align=center|3
|align=center|1:05
|London, England
|
|-
|Win
|align=center| 18–4 (1)
|Leonardo Leite
|Decision (unanimous)
|Bellator 186
|
|align=center|3
|align=center|5:00
|University Park, Pennsylvania, United States
|
|-
|Loss
|align=center| 17–4 (1)
|Ryan Bader
|Decision (split)
|Bellator 180
|
|align=center|5
|align=center|5:00
|New York City, New York, United States
|
|-
|Win
|align=center| 17–3 (1)
|Liam McGeary
|Decision (unanimous)
|Bellator 163
|
|align=center|5
|align=center|5:00
|Uncasville, Connecticut, United States
|
|-
| Win
| align=center| 16–3 (1)
| Muhammed Lawal
| Decision (unanimous)
| Bellator 154
| 
| align=center| 3
| align=center| 5:00
| San Jose, California, United States
| 
|-
| Win
| align=center| 15–3 (1)
| Francis Carmont
| KO (punches)
|rowspan="2"| Bellator 142: Dynamite 1
|rowspan="2"| 
| align=center| 1
| align=center| 2:15
|rowspan="2"| San Jose, California, United States
| 
|-
| Win
| align=center| 14–3 (1)
| Emanuel Newton
| Submission (kimura)
| align=center| 1
| align=center| 4:39
| 
|-
| Loss
| align=center| 13–3 (1)
| Ryan Bader
| Decision (split)
| UFC on Fox: Gustafsson vs. Johnson
| 
| align=center| 3
| align=center| 5:00
| Stockholm, Sweden
| 
|-
| Win
| align=center| 13–2 (1)
| Glover Teixeira
| Decision (unanimous)
| UFC 179
| 
| align=center| 3
| align=center| 5:00
| Rio de Janeiro, Brazil
| 
|-
| Loss
| align=center| 12–2 (1)
| Anthony Johnson
| Decision (unanimous)
| UFC 172
| 
| align=center| 3
| align=center| 5:00
| Baltimore, Maryland, United States
| 
|-
| Win
| align=center| 12–1 (1)
| Lyoto Machida
| Decision (unanimous)
| UFC 163
| 
| align=center| 3
| align=center| 5:00
| Rio de Janeiro, Brazil
| 
|-
| Win
| align=center| 11–1 (1)
| Vinny Magalhães
| Decision (unanimous)
| UFC 159
| 
| align=center| 3
| align=center| 5:00
| Newark, New Jersey, United States
| 
|-
|  Win
| align=center| 10–1 (1)
| Wagner Prado
| Submission (anaconda choke)
| UFC 153
| 
| align=center| 2
| align=center| 4:29
| Rio de Janeiro, Brazil
| 
|-
| NC
| align=center| 9–1 (1)
| Wagner Prado
| NC (accidental eye poke)
| UFC on Fox: Shogun vs. Vera
| 
| align=center| 1
| align=center| 1:28
| Los Angeles, California, United States
| 
|-
| Loss
| align=center| 9–1
| Rashad Evans
| Decision (unanimous)
| UFC on Fox: Evans vs. Davis
| 
| align=center| 5
| align=center| 5:00
| Chicago, Illinois, United States
| 
|-
| Win
| align=center| 9–0
| Antônio Rogério Nogueira
| Decision (unanimous)
| UFC Fight Night: Nogueira vs. Davis
| 
| align=center| 3
| align=center| 5:00
| Seattle, Washington, United States
| 
|-
| Win
| align=center| 8–0
| Tim Boetsch
| Submission (modified kimura)
| UFC 123
| 
| align=center| 2
| align=center| 2:55
| Auburn Hills, Michigan, United States
| 
|-
| Win
| align=center| 7–0
| Rodney Wallace
| Decision (unanimous)
| UFC 117
| 
| align=center| 3
| align=center| 5:00
| Oakland, California, United States
| 
|-
| Win
| align=center| 6–0
| Alexander Gustafsson
| Submission (anaconda choke)
| UFC 112
| 
| align=center| 1
| align=center| 4:55
| Abu Dhabi, United Arab Emirates
| 
|-
| Win
| align=center| 5–0
| Brian Stann
| Decision (unanimous)
| UFC 109
| 
| align=center| 3
| align=center| 5:00
| Las Vegas, Nevada, United States
| 
|-
| Win
| align=center| 4–0
| David Baggett
| Submission (rear-naked choke)
| Ultimate Cage FC 1
| 
| align=center| 1
| align=center| 3:37
| Pittsburgh, Pennsylvania, United States
| 
|-
| Win
| align=center| 3–0
| Terry Cohens
| TKO (punches)
| Ultimate Warrior Challenge 6
| 
| align=center| 1
| align=center| 4:29
| Fairfax, Virginia, United States
| 
|-
| Win
| align=center| 2–0
| Josh Green
| TKO (punches)
| PFC 12: High Stakes
| 
| align=center| 1
| align=center| 1:49
| Lemoore, California, United States
| 
|-
| Win
| align=center| 1–0
| Brett Chism
| Decision (unanimous)
| No Boundary 1
| 
| align=center| 2
| align=center| 5:00
| Plymouth, Massachusetts, United States
|

NCAA record

! colspan="8"| NCAA Championships Matches
|-
!  Res.
!  Record
!  Opponent
!  Score
!  Date
!  Event
|-
! style=background:white colspan=6 |2008 NCAA Championships  at 197 lbs
|-
|Win
|15–5
|align=left|Wynn Michalak
|style="font-size:88%"|7–2
|style="font-size:88%" rowspan=5|March 22, 2008
|style="font-size:88%" rowspan=5|2008 NCAA Division I Wrestling Championships
|-
|Win
|14–5
|align=left|Dallas Herbst
|style="font-size:88%"|6–0
|-
|Win
|13–5
|align=left|Hudson Taylor
|style="font-size:88%"|7–3
|-
|Win
|12–5
|align=left|Logan Brown
|style="font-size:88%"|9–2
|-
|Win
|11–5
|align=left|Riley Orozco
|style="font-size:88%"|Fall
|-
! style=background:white colspan=6 |2007 NCAA Championships 5th at 197 lbs
|-
|Loss
|10–5
|align=left|J.D Bergman
|style="font-size:88%"|4–5
|style="font-size:88%" rowspan=5|March 16, 2007
|style="font-size:88%" rowspan=5|2007 NCAA Division I Wrestling Championships
|-
|Loss
|10–4
|align=left|Kurt Backes
|style="font-size:88%"|4–5
|-
|Win
|10–3
|align=left|Jerry Rinaldi
|style="font-size:88%"|6–3
|-
|Win
|9–3
|align=left|Travis Gardner
|style="font-size:88%"|Fall
|-
|Win
|8–3
|align=left|Ryan Goodman
|style="font-size:88%"|9–3
|-
! style=background:white colspan=6 |2006 NCAA Championships  at 197 lbs
|-
|Loss
|7–3
|align=left|Jake Rosholt
|style="font-size:88%"|3–10
|style="font-size:88%" rowspan=5|March 18, 2006
|style="font-size:88%" rowspan=5|2006 NCAA Division I Wrestling Championships
|-
|Win
|7–2
|align=left|Jerry Rinaldi
|style="font-size:88%"|7–4
|-
|Win
|6–2
|align=left|B.J Padden
|style="font-size:88%"|6–5
|-
|Win
|5–2
|align=left|Ryan Goodman
|style="font-size:88%"|6–2
|-
|Win
|4–2
|align=left|Jon Oplinger
|style="font-size:88%"|11–0
|-
! style=background:white colspan=6 |2005 NCAA Championships 7th at 197 lbs
|-
|Loss
|3–2
|align=left|Wynn Michalak
|style="font-size:88%"|5–6
|style="font-size:88%" rowspan=6|March 18, 2005
|style="font-size:88%" rowspan=6|2005 NCAA Division I Wrestling Championships
|-
|Win
|3–1
|align=left|Chris Skretkowicz
|style="font-size:88%"|12–6
|-
|Loss
|2–1
|align=left|Jake Rosholt
|style="font-size:88%"|4–9
|-
|Win
|2–0
|align=left|Ryan Bader
|style="font-size:88%"|3–1
|-
|Win
|1–0
|align=left|Jerry Rinaldi
|style="font-size:88%"|7–1
|-

See also
List of current Bellator fighters
List of male mixed martial artists

References

External links

 
 
 
 

1984 births
Living people
American male mixed martial artists
Mixed martial artists from Pennsylvania
Light heavyweight mixed martial artists
Mixed martial artists utilizing collegiate wrestling
Mixed martial artists utilizing boxing
Mixed martial artists utilizing Muay Thai
Mixed martial artists utilizing Brazilian jiu-jitsu
African-American mixed martial artists
American male sport wrestlers
American practitioners of Brazilian jiu-jitsu
American Muay Thai practitioners
Sportspeople from Harrisburg, Pennsylvania
Sportspeople from Chula Vista, California
Penn State Nittany Lions wrestlers
Bellator MMA champions
Ultimate Fighting Championship male fighters
Bellator male fighters
21st-century African-American sportspeople
20th-century African-American people